Miss Spain 2010 is the 50th edition of the beauty pageant Miss Spain. The pageant was held in Toledo on September 25. There were 52 contestants representing each provinces of Spain.

Paula Guilló from Teruel won the competition and represented Spain in Miss Universe 2011.

First runner-up will represent the country in Miss World 2011. The rest of the Top 6 was represented Spain in Miss International 2011, Reina Hispanoamericana 2011 and Reinado Internacional del Café 2011 and other pageants.

Miss Spain 2010 contestants wore Alyce Paris Designs gowns.

Results

Delegates

References

External links
 Official Website

Miss Spain
2010 in Spain
2010 beauty pageants
2010s in Castilla–La Mancha
Toledo, Spain
History of the province of Toledo
Events in Castilla–La Mancha